The 1892 Lafayette football team was an American football team that represented Lafayette College as an independent during the 1892 college football season. In its second and final year under head coach Wallace Moyle, the team compiled a 5–7 record and was outscored by a total of 139 to 126. Gustave Voight was the team captain. The team played its home games on The Quad in Easton, Pennsylvania.

Schedule

References

Lafayette
Lafayette Leopards football seasons
Lafayette football